Fechter may refer to:

 Aaron Fechter, American engineer and inventor
 Charles Albert Fechter (1822–1879), French-British actor
  (1717–1797), Swiss engineer, master builder and geodaesist
  (1885–1955), German admiral, younger brother of Paul Fechter
  (1880–1958), German theatre critic, editor and a writer
 Peter Fechter (1944–1962), German bricklayer, one of the first victims of the Berlin Wall's border guards
 Steven Fechter, playwright and an award-winning screenwriter
  (1910–1994), German Germanist

See also 
 Fechter's Finger Flinging Frolic, Magic conventions
 2533 Fechtig
 Fechteler (disambiguation)
 Fechner

German-language surnames
Occupational surnames